Futebol Club Ferreiras is football team located in the town of Ferreiras, within the municipality of Albufeira, Algarve, Portugal. They participate in Serie 'H' of the  Campeonato Nacional de Seniores (Seniors National Championship) which is the third league of football in Portugal.

History
The football club was formed on 1 December 1983
and for the first 29 years the first team played in the regional league in the Algarve. In the 2013–14 season, the club was promoted to the Seniors National Championship. This was the first time the club had spent a season at a national level in its history.

Stadium
The club plays all its home matches at the Estádio da Nora which in the town of Ferreiras. The stadium has a capacity of 2,000

Current squad

Gallery

External links
 Official website

References

Futebol Club Ferreiras
Football clubs in Portugal
Association football clubs established in 1983
1980 establishments in Portugal
Sport in Albufeira